Thorneside is a coastal urban locality in the City of Redland, Queensland, Australia.

Geography 
The locality is bounded to the north-east by Waterloo Bay, a part of Moreton Bay. It is bounded to the west by Tingalpa Creek. Mooroondu Point is the northernmost part of the locality at the mouth of the creek, jutting into the bay

The Cleveland railway line enters the locality from the west (Ransome) and exits to the south-east (Birkdale) with the locality served by Thorneside railway station. 

Residential development in the suburb is predominately housing estates built around Thorneside Road and Mooroondu Road.

History 
The locality is named after the Thorneside railway station, originally named Thorne's siding after William Thorne who bought a lot of land around Thorneside when it was originally subdivided in 1913.  At that time the land was known as Thorne's estate.

The median age of the Thorneside population was 38 years, 1 year above the national median of 37.  74.2% of people living in Thorneside were born in Australia. The other top responses for country of birth were New Zealand 6.4%, England 5.7%, Scotland 0.8%, South Africa 0.7%, Ireland 0.7%. 90.6% of people spoke only English at home; the next most common languages were 0.4% Spanish, 0.3% Punjabi, 0.3% Russian, 0.3% French, 0.3% Japanese.

Amenities 
Thorneside Community Hall is at 200-204 Mooroondu Road; it is operated by the Redland City Council.

The Redland City Council operates a mobile library service which visits Beth Boyd Park and Thorneside Community Hall.

There is a boat ramp on the corner of  Queens Esplanade and Helen Street on the south bank of Tingalpa Creek. It is managed by the Redland City Council.

Parks 
There are a number of parks in the area:

 Beth Boyd Park, 76-92 Mooroondu Road
 Ferry Road Park
 Frank Street Park

 John Street Park

 Railway Parade Park

 William Taylor Memorial Sportsfield

William Taylor Memorial Sportsfield (also known as Mooroondu Sports field has facilities for soccer, netball, cricket, and tennis.

Other amenities 
Other amenities include:
 Willard Webber Reserve
 Queens Esplanade
 Canoe Club Located beside Tingalpa Creek

References

External links
 

Suburbs of Redland City
Coastline of Queensland
Localities in Queensland